Ian Bowling (born 27 July 1965) is an English former professional footballer who played as goalkeeper. He is goalkeeping coach at Staveley MWFC.

Playing career
Bowling started his professional career with Lincoln City whom he joined from Gainsborough Trinity in November 1988. Prior to that, he had spent some time with Stafford Rangers and Frecheville CA. During his time with The Imps, Bowling made 51 appearances for the club. He was also sent out on loan to Hartlepool United, Kettering Town and Bradford City.

Following the successful loan spell with Bradford City, Bowling joined them in July 1993. He made 29 appearances joining Mansfield Town in the following season.

Bowling will probably be most remembered as a Stags legend as he spent the best part of five seasons, making 172 appearances for the club. Bowling left Mansfield Town in July 2000 having not been offered a new contract, and in September 2000, joined Kettering Town. In February 2002 he suffered a serious head injury in the game against Tiverton Town when he collided with a goalpost. The injury caused him to miss the remaining thirteen games of Kettering's triumphant Southern Football League Premier Division season. He made his comeback from injury in July 2002.

He subsequently joined Worksop Town in May 2003. He joined Stalybridge Celtic on loan in December 2003. He made his debut in the 1–1 home draw with Burscough on 6 December 2003 and made a total of five appearances, four in the league, before returning to Worksop at end of the month. He spent a month on loan at Hucknall Town in September 2004 and the first three months of 2005 on loan at Matlock Town before returning to the Worksop Town first team making his final appearance, before retirement, in April 2005.

Managerial career
Bowling remained with Worksop as goalkeeping coach. In early November 2006, Bowling was appointed manager of Worksop Town. This was after a successful period as caretaker manager, where a renewed emphasis on attacking football was rewarded with results on the pitch, and Bowling himself winning his first Manager of the Month award at the end of October that year. He replaced the previous coach, Ronnie Glavin, who left the club by mutual content at the beginning of October 2006. However, he was sacked at the end of the season after Worksop's relegation from the Conference North.

In October 2007 he was appointed as goalkeeping coach at Matlock Town, linking up with his former Lincoln City and Kettering Town colleague Phil Brown. He will also combine his role with scouting duties. In May 2015 he joined Staveley Miners Welfare as first team goalkeeping coach.

References

External links

Stalybridge Celtic F.C. Profile

1965 births
Living people
English footballers
Association football goalkeepers
Footballers from Sheffield
Stafford Rangers F.C. players
Gainsborough Trinity F.C. players
Lincoln City F.C. players
Hartlepool United F.C. players
Bradford City A.F.C. players
Mansfield Town F.C. players
Kettering Town F.C. players
Frecheville Community Association F.C. players
Worksop Town F.C. players
Stalybridge Celtic F.C. players
Hucknall Town F.C. players
Matlock Town F.C. players